Victoria "Vicky" Quirino-Gonzalez (born Victoria Syquia Quirino; May 18, 1931 – November 29, 2006) was the second daughter of Philippine President Elpidio Quirino. Since her father was a widower, she served as First Lady of the Philippines, becoming the youngest bearer of the title at the age of 16. 

Her mother, Alicia Syquia, as well as three of her siblings, were all massacred by Japanese troops as they occupied the country during the Second World War.

Term
She assumed the title in 1948 when President Manuel Roxas died and her father, then Vice-President of the Philippines succeeded him. When her father's term ended in 1953, she was succeeded by Luz Magsaysay.

Following tradition, Quiríno-González became involved in socio-civic activities. She was the second Presidential daughter to have a debut in Malacañan Palace, and again made history as the first Presidential daughter to be wed in the Palace when she married her first husband, Luis "Chito" González.

Later years and death
She was silently but actively involved in supporting social causes in her later years. 
She died on November 29, 2006 at the age of 75.

Her grandchildren include Victoria Álvarez de Toledo y González, María Álvarez de Toledo y González, and Lucía Álvarez de Toledo y González, daughters of her own daughter María Victoria González Quiríno and Manuel Álvarez de Toledo y Mencos (the Marqués de Miraflores, V Duque de Zaragoza, XIII Conde de los Arcos, three times a Grandee of Spain).

References

External links

|-

 

1931 births
2006 deaths
Filipino Roman Catholics
People from Vigan
Ilocano people
Children of presidents of the Philippines
Victoria
First Ladies and First Gentlemen of the Philippines